Dharoi Dam is a gravity dam on the Sabarmati river near Dharoi, Satlasana Taluka, Mehsana district of northern Gujarat in India. Constructed in 1978, the dam is meant for irrigation, power generation and flood control.

About

19 villages partially and 28 villages fully submerged into its reservoir so they were relocated to new villages. Total land submerged under reservoir include  forest land,  wasteland,  cultivable land.

It irrigated  in 2007–08.

References

External links
 Dharoi Dam on OpenStreetMap

Sabarkantha district
Dams in Gujarat
Dams in Sabarmati River basin
Mehsana district
Gravity dams
Tourist attractions in Mehsana district
Tourist attractions in Sabarkantha district
1978 establishments in Gujarat
Dams completed in 1978
Hydroelectric power stations in Gujarat
20th-century architecture in India